Elmer Belt (April 10, 1893 – May 17, 1980) was an internationally recognized urologist, a pioneer in sex-change surgery, an important mover in the founding of the UCLA School of Medicine, and a book collector known for assembling a library of research materials about Leonardo da Vinci—the Elmer Belt Library of Vinciana—which he donated to the University of California, Los Angeles  between 1961-66.

Early life and education
Arthur Elmer Belt was born in Chicago, Illinois on April 10, 1893. Both of his parents worked for the post office. The family moved to Southern California when Belt was nine. Elmer Belt (the form of name he preferred) received his early education in Orange County, but attended Los Angeles High School, traveling there on horseback. During high school he took courses in Latin, a medical school prerequisite, and met Ruth Smart, whom he would marry in 1918. Because Los Angeles High School was located at the top of a hill and at least an hour's walk to a shop where students could obtain supplies, Belt came up with the entrepreneurial idea of starting a small book-and-supplies store at the school. This enterprise led him to become acquainted with some of the city's leading bookmen, in particular Ernest Dawson, patriarch and founder of a distinguished line of booksellers. Recounting this story in a letter from 1979, Belt wrote, “As a Freshman in High School, I learned what an Aldine was and about Gutenberg and his woes and all of the wonderful world of books.

During Belt's teens, his father suffered from an abdominal attack that required surgery. When the surgeon came out to report that the family patriarch had not survived the operation, the young Belt noticed that the surgeon smelled strongly of alcohol. He immediately concluded that the surgeon had botched the surgery and killed his father. Taking a lesson from this tragedy, Belt vowed never to drink alcohol. At the time, Belt's mother was employed and thus was able to provide for him and his sister Olive. Crucially, she was able to support Belt through medical school.
Belt attended the University of California Berkeley, obtaining a B.A. in 1916 and an M.A. in 1917. (He was a member of the first class taught by Herbert McLean Evans.) He then attended the University of California, San Francisco School of Medicine, where he was chosen to be a fellow of the Hooper Institute for Medical Research, working in urology with Dr. George Whipple and Dr. Frank Hinman. After finishing medical school in 1920, Belt continued as a Resident in Urology with Dr. Hinman. However, Belt's young son Charles had been in a serious auto accident, and his father felt he would receive better care from famed orthopedist Robert W. Lovett at Harvard Medical School. So Belt applied for a residency in General Surgery at Harvard University-affiliated Peter Bent Brigham Hospital and spent a year working under Dr. Harvey Cushing. (Unfortunately, Charles Belt continued to have physical problems later in life.)

While in medical school, Belt had taken a non-credit elective course in the History of Medicine taught by Dr. George Washington Corner, an anatomist who had recently come to the University of California from Johns Hopkins University. It was during this class that Belt developed his lifelong interest in Leonardo da Vinci. It was, he relates, "in that course that I was assigned the subject of Leonardo da Vinci . . . and I was so fascinated that I began collecting everything I could about him."

Career 
In 1923, Belt and his wife moved to Los Angeles, where he began a private practice. In 1936 he established the Elmer Belt Urologic Group, which occupied its own building at 1893 Wilshire Boulevard. The second floor of the building housed Belt's ever-expanding library. During this period, due to his rising prominence in his profession, he enjoyed privileges as a staff, attending, or consulting urologist at many hospitals around Los Angeles County.

In addition to specializing in urology, Belt was a passionate advocate for public health and, from 1939 through 1954, served as the President of the State Board of Public Health. First appointed to this position by California Governor Culbert Olsen, Belt was reappointed by Governor Earl Warren for each of the latter's three terms in office. In the public health arena, Belt's projects included working to establish the Hyperion Water Reclamation Plant for Los Angeles. He also advocated for the care and rights of refugees from the Dust Bowl who had settled in Tulare County. And during WWII, he campaigned for funds to treat what was then called venereal disease and to control prostitution, which posed serious problems around army and naval encampments in the state.

Belt was the author of numerous publications concerning both urology  and Leonardo da Vinci

Role in the establishment of the UCLA School of Medicine 
From the time he returned to California from Boston in 1923, Belt advocated for the establishment of a medical school at UCLA. Despite his growing status and influence, his efforts were thwarted by the economic and political dislocations of the Great Depression and WWII. However, in 1945, after the war ended, Belt was able to mount a lobbying campaign for his cause with the Appropriations Committee of the State Legislature. He was personal physician to Governor Earl Warren, and during one consultation, he delivered an impassioned plea that a medical school be established under the administration of UCLA.  Before he left Belt's office, Warren took out a notebook and jotted down a ten-step action plan for getting the project off the ground and through the state legislature. As the tenth and final step, Warren wrote, “Come and stand behind me when I sign this [legislation].” On February 19, 1946, with Belt and a few other dignitaries standing behind him, Warren signed a bill appropriating $7 million dollars for a medical school at UCLA.

After approval was granted for a medical school for UCLA, a decision had to be made as to where it should be located, on campus or off campus. The Regents’ committee on location for the medical school announced that they were unable to find an area large enough on campus to accommodate it. Dr. Belt was concerned that the medical school would end up going to somewhere far afield, like the county hospital downtown, so he made a scouting trip to Westwood to review all available land. He came across a nearly vacant 33-acre tract of land that ran from Wilshire Boulevard north to Strathmore Drive and from the western edge of Westwood Village to Veteran Avenue. Dr. Belt then consulted Dr. Edward Janss, the developer who gave the land for the UCLA campus, as to the ownership of the property. He learned that it was owned by the Veterans Hospital Association and that it would take an act of Congress to separate the land from the Veterans Hospital facility. This would have to be accomplished through a bill introduced into Congress and, if signed by the President, it would become the law. The bill would have to propose that the land be separated and given to the University of California. In advance, the University would have to ask for it. This was the first requisite and it proved to be the hardest one because the central authority of the University would not make the request. Finally, however, Clarence Dykstra, then Chancellor of UCLA, agreed to arrange acceptance for the transfer by the Veterans Hospital Administration. The bill arrived before the eighty-first Congress as the last bill on the docket. At this point, Dr. Belt reached out to Edwin W. Pauley, who had managed the government's oil program during WWII, and who was instrumental in Truman becoming Roosevelt's vice-presidential running mate in the 1944 election. Dr. Belt did not know Pauley, but he did know his wife, who helped facilitate a meeting between her husband and Dr. Belt in the Pauley's home. After hearing Dr. Belt's plea for help, Pauley phoned President Truman and convinced him to sign the legislation that allowed for the transfer of the land from the Veterans Administration to the University of California for the construction of the medical school.

Belt helped recruit the School of Medicine's first dean, Stafford L. Warren, who was appointed in 1947. In the fall of 1951, the medical school enrolled its first class, which consisted of 30 students—28 men and two women. Because there was as yet no building to house the medical school, classes were held in temporary bungalows and in a building UCLA had purchased that had formerly been known as the Religious Conference Building. At this time, there were 15 faculty members, including Belt, who served as Clinical Professor of Surgery (Urology). The main sites for clinical work and research in these nascent days of the School were the UCLA-affiliated hospitals of the Veterans Administration (the Wadsworth Hospital) in Brentwood; and the Veterans Administration Hospital in Long Beach. An affiliation was also established with Harbor Hospital in Torrance in 1951, at which point it, too, became a teaching hospital for the UCLA School of Medicine. In 1955 the university completed work on the UCLA Medical Center, giving the Medical School a permanent home. Not long afterwards, University of California President Robert Gordon Sproul characterized Belt as "The Life Belt of the UCLA Medical School." Belt remained a staunch supporter of the School for the rest of his life. The school was named the David Geffen School of Medicine at UCLA in 2001 in honor of David Geffen who donated $200 million in unrestricted funds.

Gender-affirming surgery 
Belt may have been the first surgeon in the United States to perform gender affirmation surgery, which he was likely doing by 1950. However, ascertaining exactly when he did them is not possible because a fire in Belt's medical office in 1958 destroyed many, if not all, records prior to that year. The surgeries were performed at Good Samaritan Hospital, where Belt's Urologic Group's surgical practice was conducted; he did not perform them at UCLA.

Belt was the uncle of Willard Elmer Goodwin, M.D. (1915-1998) who, in 1951, was the founding chair of the Division of Urology in the Department of Surgery at the UCLA School of Medicine. Belt trained his nephew in the techniques of sex-change surgery. In 1954 a committee of UCLA doctors, including Goodwin and members of the Psychiatry Department, decided that these surgeries should no longer be performed under the aegis of the university. However, Goodwin continued to perform them quietly. At the end of 1954, Belt temporarily ceased his transgender surgeries, but in the late 1950s he resumed his sex-reassignment practice.

Belt received referrals from endocrinologist/sexologist Dr. Harry Benjamin; Dr. LeMon Clark, professor of Gynecology at the University of Arkansas and editor of Sexology Magazine; and others. Many prospective patients wrote to directly to  Belt, who responded to these inquiries thoroughly and compassionately, as can be ascertained in surviving correspondence in the Elmer Belt Papers housed in UCLA Library Special Collections, Medicine and Science.

Belt performed male-to-female operations. One of his best known patients was Patricia Morgan.

In early 1962, at the age of 69, and under pressure from his wife, his son Bruce, and his office manager, Belt ceased performing sex-change operations. In addition to feeling these pressures, Belt was concerned that a dissatisfied patient might sue him and ruin his practice. It was also becoming increasingly difficult to find hospitals that would allow him to perform sex-reassignment surgery. Finally, he knew there were other doctors to whom he could refer patients, including Goodwin and Dr. Georges Burou, a French surgeon with a clinic in Casablanca.

Elmer Belt as a Book and Manuscript Collector 
A lifelong bibliophile, Belt began collecting books as a boy and, by his mid-teens, had assembled a prized collection of comic books and dime novels. Unfortunately, Belt's mother did not understand how important these collections were to him, and she discarded them when he went to college—a loss he lamented for the rest of his life.

Belt also collected works by Upton Sinclair and, in 1934, supported Sinclair's campaign for governor of California. He donated his Upton Sinclair collection to Occidental College Library including  first editions "warmly inscribed from Sinclair to Elmer Belt, who was his physician. in 1950."

In addition, Belt formed collections around neurologist Silas Weir Mitchell and the founder of modern nursing,  Florence Nightingale. He donated both collections to the Louise M. Darling Biomedical Library at UCLA.

In 2014 the remainder of Belt's collection was sold at auction including an  illuminated manuscript by Dante Gabriel Rossetti of The Blessed Damozel by Alberto Sangorski; California mission etchings by Henry Ford (illustrator); a  handwritten manuscript by Bertrand Russell and a signed  Sierra Nevada: The John Muir Trail by Ansel Adams.

The Elmer Belt Library of Vinciana 

Dr. Belt's Leonardo da Vinci collection was his major undertaking as a collector. He aimed to build the most extensive collection on Leonardo in the world by acquiring (1) all editions of Leonardo's works in facsimile; (2) all published works known to have been consulted by Leonardo in the editions the artist used (“Leonardo's Library”); (3) many early-printed books important to the history of art, beginning with Giorgio Vasari's Lives of the Artists; and (4) modern scholarly literature on Leonardo and his legacy in the arts and sciences. He also ultimately acquired all printed editions of Leonardo's Treatise on Painting plus two important manuscript versions of the Treatise that preceded the first printed edition; and a collection of Leonardo-related graphic arts materials, such as prints after the artist's so-called "grotesques."   
Beginning in the 1930s, Dr. Belt began working with the Los Angeles book dealer and cultural catalyst Jacob Zeitlin, who acted as Dr. Belt's agent in purchasing materials for his collection.

By 1945, the Leonardo collection had grown to the extent that Belt engaged a full-time librarian, Kate Steinitz, to manage it. A former patient of Belt's, Steinitz was an important artist who had been active in the avant-garde art scene during the Weimar Republic and who had fled Germany after Hitler came to power.

Between 1961 and 1966, Belt donated in installments his Leonardo da Vinci collection to UCLA on the condition that the University maintain his collection and not integrate it with the rest of the library's holdings. In 2011 a  fiftieth anniversary tribute to the collector was held at the Department of Special Collections. From 1966 to 2002, the Elmer Belt Library of Vinciana was housed in an elegant suite of rooms within the Art Library in Dickson Art Center. The wood-paneled rooms were furnished with Renaissance furniture, antiques, artwork, and art objects donated by the Kress Foundation and Norton Simon. In 2002, counter to the terms of the gift, the Elmer Belt Library of Vinciana was integrated into UCLA Library Special Collections.

Personal life 
Belt married the former Mary Ruth Smart (1892-1983) in 1918. Like her husband, Ruth (her preferred name), attended the University of California, Berkeley. After graduating, she attended a full-time program in library science organized by the University Library and offered under the College of Letters and Science. After they settled permanently in Los Angeles in 1923, she became a social and cultural leader in the city. She served on the Los Angeles Library Commission and the Opera Guild of Southern California. She also was president of the UCLA Art Council and helped launch major fundraising events for that group. In 1959, she led a drive to add 35 cents for the city tax rate to help support the city's public elementary schools. She was as well a founding director of the World Affairs Council and national vice president of the Travelers Aid Society. She died on January 9, 1983.

The Belts had two sons, Charles Elmer Belt and Bruce Gregory Belt.

Charles Belt (1919-1994) attended the University of Southern California. He was married to Marie Saunders from 1958-1966. He married Marie Catherine Patino on 15 August 1967, in San Diego, California. He died on May 26, 1994, in his hometown, at the age of 75. 
Bruce Belt (1926-2012) followed in his father's footsteps and became a urologist, practicing medicine in the Elmer Belt Urological Group for some 20 years. However, he did not enjoy being a doctor. In 1977 he left medicine and, at the age of 51, embarked on a career in education, becoming a successful and popular teacher of Biology, Chemistry, Latin, and Geography at the Brentwood School.

Belt's sister Olive married Willard Goodwin, Sr. Their son Willard Goodwin, M.D. (1915-1998), was founding chair of the Division of Urology in the Department of Surgery at the UCLA School of Medicine. Like his uncle, Goodwin performed sex-change surgeries. He was also known for  his work in organ and graft transplantation.

The Belt Residence was located at 2201 Fern Dell Place in Los Feliz.
Not long after suffering a stroke, Belt died on May 17, 1980 at age 87.

Awards and honors
1951: honorary Phi Beta Kappa key
1952: Italian Silver Star of Solidarity
1962: honorary Doctor of Laws degree, University of California, Los Angeles
1964: University Service Award, University of California Alumni Association
1967: President, Society for the History of Technology 
1972: Sir Thomas More Medal for Book Collecting, University of San Francisco
1976: American Urologic Association, for contributions to the History of Urology and to the Forum
1977: Aesculapian Award, University of California, Los Angeles School of Medicine

Archival sources 

 Elmer Belt Papers 1920-1980, bulk 1958-1978. Louise M. Darling Biomedical Library History and Special Collections for the Sciences, University of California, Los Angeles. Opened for research 2010. http://www.oac.cdlib.org/findaid/ark:/13030/kt2199r6k1/admin/?query=Belt%20(Elmer)%20papers#acqinfo-1.2.6
Note: the papers contain very little prior to 1958. In that year, a fire in Belt's medical offices seem destroyed almost everything dated earlier than 1958. in addition, access is restricted for some materials owing to patient or legal confidentiality protocols.
Elmer Belt Papers. Library Special Collections, Charles E. Young Research Library, UCLA. Unprocessed collection. 286 boxes.
 The Harry Benjamin Collection, Library and Special Collections,The Kinsey Institute for Research in Sex, Gender and Reproduction, Indiana University, Bloomington. http://webapp1.dlib.indiana.edu/findingaids/view?brand=general&docId=VAC1594&chunk.id=d1e76&startDoc=1
 Willard E. Goodwin papers, 1915-1998, bulk 1915-1998. Library Special Collections, Charles E. Young Research Library, UCLA. Opened for research 2007. http://www.oac.cdlib.org/findaid/ark:/13030/kt367nd8mf/?query=Goodwin+(Willard+E.)+papers
 Robert J. Stoller Papers, 1942-1991. Library Special Collections, Charles E. Young Research Library, UCLA. http://www.oac.cdlib.org/findaid/ark:/13030/tf5s2006mg/admin/?query=Robert%20Stoller#descgrp-1.8.2

Digital sources 
Dr.Elmer Belt Tate.
 The Elmer Belt Library of Vinciana Internet Archive.
 Elmer Belt collection of Vinciana graphic arts. Online Archive of California.
 Zagria. A Gender Variance Who's Who. https://zagria.blogspot.com/2019/03/elmer-belt-1893-1980-urologist-pioneer.html

Printed sources 
Arthur, Ransom. By the Old Pacific's Rolling Water: Birth of the UCLA School of Medicine. Los Angeles: School of Medicine, University of California, 1992.

Belt, Elmer. "Elmer Belt." In There Was Light: Autobiography of a University, Berkeley: 1868-1968, edited by Irving Stone, 353-367. New York: Doubleday, 1970.

Marmor, Max. "The Elmer Belt Library of Vinciana." The Book Collector, 38, no. 3 (Autumn 1989): 1-23.

Meyerowitz, Joanne. How Sex Changed: A History of Transsexuality in the United States. Cambridge, MA: Harvard University Press, 2002.

Pedretti, Carlo. Leonardo da Vinci: Studies for a Nativity and the 'Mona Lisa Cartoon' with Drawings after Leonardo from the Elmer Belt Library of Vinciana: Exhibition in Honour of Elmer Belt, M.D. on the Occasion of his Eightieth Birthday. Los Angeles: University of California, 1973.

Surgeon and Bibliophile: Elmer Belt. Oral History Transcript; interviewed by Esther de Vécsey between 1974-75. Los Angeles: Oral History Program, University of California, Los Angeles, 1983.

Notes 

 Stanley Brosman, urologist and close friend of Elmer Belt, supplied personal memories about Elmer Belt that added to the accuracy of this entry. Interview on February 8, 2021.
 Arthur Schapiro, urologist, colleague, and friend of Elmer Belt, also supplied, through numerous exchanges between 2019 and 2021, supplied much critical information and help in creating this entry.

References

External links
 The Elmer Belt Library of Vinciana

1893 births
1980 deaths
Surgeons specializing in transgender medicine
University of California, Berkeley alumni
American urologists
David Geffen School of Medicine at UCLA faculty
20th-century surgeons
Book and manuscript collectors
History of medicine
Bibliophiles